Joseph-Clément Garnier (3 October 1813 – 25 September 1881) was a French economist and politician.
He was a prolific author and a member of many learned societies. In the last years of his life he was a Senator for Alpes-Maritimes.

Life

Joseph Garnier was born in Beuil, Alpes Maritimes, on 3 October 1813, son of a farmer.
He studied at the Draguignan, then in 1829 entered the Ecole supérieure de commerce de Paris.
On the recommendation of the director of the school, the economist Jérôme-Adolphe Blanqui, he was appointed assistant professor and then director of studies.
At the same time he published articles on political economy.
In 1835 he became an editor at Le National.
In 1838 he founded a vocational education center, which he managed until 1843.
Garnier was one of the founders of the Journal des Economistes in 1841, of which he became director in 1845.

Joseph Garnier and his friends Adolphe-Gustave Blaise (1811–86) and Gilbert Guillaumin (1801–64) decided to form a society that would meet once a month to dine and discuss political economy. 
The first meeting of the Société d'économie politique with five people was held on 15 November 1842 including Blaise, Garnier, Guillaumin and Eugène Daire (1798–1847).
The numbers grew with successive meetings.
The society was open to men with very different positions in life and diverse political views, most of them influential either through their position or their writings.
They could meet on neutral scientific grounds to exchange views on subjects such as the functions of the state, land rents, commercial freedom, public finances, the Crédit Foncier, regulations and socialism.
The central theme was always political economy.
Garnier was made permanent secretary of the Société d'Economie Politique.

In 1846 Garnier cofounded the short-lived Association pour la liberté des échanges, with others such as Frédéric Bastiat and Wolowski.
Also in 1846 he was named professor of political economy at the École des Ponts et Chaussées.
He was one of the organizers of the Congress of Friends of Peace, held in Paris in 1849, Frankfurt in 1850 and London in 1851.
He founded and directed the Nouveau Journal des Connaissances utiles (1853–1860) and contributed to the Dictionnaire de l'Economie Politique of Charles Coquelin and Gilbert-Urbain Guillaumin.
Garnier was a member of almost all the societies of statistics and political economy of Europe.

Garnier ran for election in the supplementary elections of 1871, but did not succeed.
In 1873 he was elected a member of the Académie des Sciences Morales et Politiques in place of Charles Dupin.
Garnier was elected senator of Alpes-Maritimes on 30 January 1876 with 121 out of 207 voters.
He sat on the left, and consistently voted with the Republicans until his death.
Joseph Garnier died in Paris on 25 September 1881.
He had been made a Knight of the Legion of Honour in August 1860.

Publications

Besides his economic articles in the Presse, National, Siècle and Journal des Débats, Garnier published a great number of works.
The best known include the Traité d'économie politique, which was often reprinted, his Traité de finances, the Annuaire d'économie politique et de statistique, which he published from 1844 to 1855 in collaboration with Guillaumin, a revised edition of Malthus and a Traité sur le principe de population.

Notes

Sources

1813 births
1881 deaths
French classical liberals
French economists
French Senators of the Third Republic
Senators of Alpes-Maritimes
Members of the Académie des sciences morales et politiques
ESCP Europe alumni